Pablo Podestá is a town in Tres de Febrero Partido of Buenos Aires Province, Argentina. It is located in the Greater Buenos Aires urban agglomeration.

Name
The town is named after Argentine actor Pablo Podestá (22 November 1875 – 26 April 1923).

External links

Populated places in Buenos Aires Province
Tres de Febrero Partido